Sesamia nonagrioides, the Mediterranean corn borer, pink stalk borer or West African pink borer, is a moth of the family Noctuidae. It was described by Alexandre Louis Lefèbvre de Cérisy in 1827. It is found in Spain, southern France, Italy and on the Balkan Peninsula, as well as in north-western, south-western and western Africa.

The wingspan is 30–40 mm. The forewings are grey yellowish, marked with a marginal band and with rounded spots. The hindwings are white. There is a variable number of generations per year, ranging from two in southern France to up to four in Morocco.

The larvae feed on Phragmites communis and Arundo donax and probably also other grasses with thick stems. It is one of the most damaging pests of maize in the Mediterranean region. Larvae of the first generation are particularly destructive, because they tunnel the maize stem during the whole larval stage. The larvae are yellowish to brownish with a rust-coloured back and reach a length of 30–40 mm when full grown.

Parasites
Cotesia typhae is a braconid wasp used in the biological control of Sesamia nonagrioides

References

 "Sesamia nonagrioides (Lefebvre, 1827)". Insecta.pro.

External links

"09464 Sesamia nonagrioides (Lefèbvre, 1827)". Lepiforum e.V.

Moths described in 1827
Hadeninae
Moths of Europe
Moths of Asia
Moths of the Middle East